The Best of Kermit on Sesame Street is a 1998 direct-to-video special that featured Kermit and his career on Sesame Street.

Plot
Kermit is being awarded the Frog of the Year award, presented by Grover. Grover first recites a long poem about frogs, which introduces various Kermit the Frog segments from Sesame Street, while being interrupted by the Three Little Pigs, who are there because Kermit introduced them twice on Sesame Street News.

Cast
 Steve Whitmire as Kermit the Frog (New Material) and one of the Three Little Pigs
 Jim Henson as Kermit the Frog (Series)
 Frank Oz as Grover, Parker Piper and Pinocchio
 Jerry Nelson as one of the Tarnish Brothers, and Frog
 Richard Hunt as one of the Tarnish Brothers
 Lisa Buckley as one of the Three Little Pigs
 Tyler Bunch as one of the Three Little Pigs
 Kevin Clash as the Announcer, Frog
 Peter Linz as Big Bad Wolf
 Christopher Cerf as one of the Tarnish Brothers
 Ivy Austin and Cheryl Hardwick as Moo Wave Vocals

Additional Muppets performed by David Rudman, Martin P. Robinson, Noel MacNeal, Pam Arciero, Bryant Young, John Tartaglia, Rick Lyon, Jane Henson,  Caroly Wilcox, Ed Christie, Camille Kampouris, James Kroupa, Richard Termine, Pat Hodelin, Jim Martin, Cheryl Blaylock, Brian Meehl.

Child Cast
 Megan Ng as Grover's Friend
 Katie Scharf as Child from "Elbows" Sequence
 Joey Calvan as Joey

Songs
 "I Love My Elbows"
 "Caribbean Amphibian"
 "African Alphabet"
 "Do-Op Hop" (closing cut out)
 "It's Not Easy Bein' Green"
 "Tadpole" (ending cut out)
 "This Frog" (first few seconds cut out and new music added)

External links

1998 television specials
Sesame Street features
1990s American television specials
Direct-to-video specials